Galen William Laack (April 3, 1931December 31, 1958) of Abbotsford, Wisconsin was an American football guard in the National Football League for the Philadelphia Eagles.  He played college football at the University of the Pacific and was drafted in the ninth round of the 1957 NFL Draft by the Washington Redskins.

References

1931 births
1958 deaths
People from Abbotsford, Wisconsin
Players of American football from Wisconsin
American football offensive guards
Pacific Tigers football players
Philadelphia Eagles players
Road incident deaths in California